The 2003–04 South Pacific cyclone season was a below-average season with only three tropical cyclones occurring within the South Pacific to the east of 160°E. The season officially ran from November 1, 2003 to April 30, 2004 with the first disturbance of the season forming on December 4 and the last disturbance dissipating on April 23. This is the period of the year when most tropical cyclones form within the South Pacific Ocean.

During the season at least 16 people were killed from tropical disturbances whilst overall damage was estimated at $ (2004 USD; $  USD). The most damaging tropical disturbance was Cyclone Heta which caused at least $ (2004 USD; $  USD) in damage to six different countries and left three dead. The deadliest tropical disturbance of the season was Tropical Depression 10F, which was responsible for eleven deaths and caused $ (2004 USD) in damage. Cyclone Ivy also caused 2 deaths and caused $ (2004 USD; $  USD) worth of damage to Vanuatu. As a result of the impacts caused by Heta and Ivy, the names were retired from the tropical cyclone naming lists.

Within the South Pacific, tropical cyclones are monitored by the Regional Specialized Meteorological Center (RSMC) in Nadi, Fiji, and the Tropical Cyclone Warning Center (TCWC) in Wellington, New Zealand. RSMC Nadi attaches a number and an F suffix to tropical disturbances that form in or move into the South Pacific. The United States Joint Typhoon Warning Center (JTWC) issues unofficial warnings within the South Pacific, designating tropical cyclones with a number and a P suffix. RSMC Nadi and TCWC Wellington both use the Australian Tropical Cyclone Intensity Scale, and measure windspeeds over a period of ten minutes, while the JTWC measures sustained winds over a period of one minute and uses the Saffir–Simpson Hurricane Scale.

Seasonal summary

Systems

Severe Tropical Cyclone Heta 

Cyclone Heta developed in the South Pacific Ocean and reached cyclone-force winds on January 1, 2004. It struck the island of Niue with a much more direct blow on January 6. Heta's eyewall hit Niue almost exactly at the height of the storm's power. It caused extensive property damage throughout the island, and two people were killed. Efforts to rebuild from the storm in Niue lasted almost the entire year of 2004.

Heta caused American Samoa to declare a state of emergency (officially a "Declaration of Emergency" in American Samoan law) on January 7, and even though officially the storm never made landfall there, it necessitated the emergency evacuation of 140 people and was responsible for property damage.

The nation of Tonga was also affected by Heta, as the winds swept away trees that were needed for the country's food supply. However, Tonga did not receive a direct hit or suffer such extensive loss as Niue.

Severe Tropical Cyclone Ivy 

Numbered 05F. Existed between February 21 and February 28. Caused heavy damage in Vanuatu.

Tropical Depression 06F 

Formed on March 20, dumped heavy rainfall in Vanuatu. 06F was last noted on March 22.

Tropical Cyclone Grace 

Entered the region from the west on March 23, became extratropical the next day. Designated as 07F by Nadi.

Tropical Depression 08F 

Existed between March 28 and April 1.

Tropical Depression 09F 

Existed between April 1 and April 3.

Tropical Depression 10F 

Existed between April 6 and April 9. The storm was given the number 22P by the Joint Typhoon Warning Center. It was responsible for causing severe flooding to Fiji and 11 deaths. Damage from the flooding was estimated at US$2.6 million.

Tropical Depression 12F 

Formed on April 7, later caused severe flooding in Fiji. 12F was last noted on April 13.

Tropical Depression 13F 

During April 11 a weak tropical low moved into the South Pacific basin from the Australian region, and was designated as Tropical Disturbance 13F by RSMC Nadi later that day. 13F was last noted on April 13 as a Tropical Depression.

Other systems 
The first numbered tropical disturbance of the season developed within a large area of atmospheric convection on December 4, to the northwest of the Fijian dependency of Rotuma. During that day the depression slowly moved west, before it was classified as a weak tropical depression during the next day. The system subsequently weakened and lost its organisation because of moderate to strong vertical windshear and was last noted during December 6.

Over the next few days, the system remained poorly organised and slow-moving within an area of moderate vertical windshear, before it was last noted by the FMS during December 20, as it entered the Australian region. The system was located in a moderate area of vertical windshear and was poorly organised with atmospheric convection confined to the system's eastern semicircle. The system subsequently moved south-eastwards and remained poorly organised, before it was last noted by the FMS later that day while it was located to the south of San Cristobal Island.

During that day, the disturbance moved through the Tongan archipelago, before it was last noted later that day.

Over the next couple of days, the system remained poorly organised and near stationary to the northeast of the Solomon Islands, before it was last noted during April 24.

Season effects 
This table lists all the storms that developed in the South Pacific to the east of longitude 160°E during the 2003–04 season.

|-
| 01F ||  || bgcolor=#|Tropical Depression || bgcolor=#|Not Specified || bgcolor=#| || None || None || None ||
|-
| 02F ||  || bgcolor=#|Tropical Disturbance || bgcolor=#|Not Specified || bgcolor=#| || Solomon Islands || None || None ||
|-
| Heta ||  || bgcolor=#|Category 5 severe tropical cyclone || bgcolor=#| || bgcolor=#| || Samoan Islands, Niue, Tonga, Wallis and Futuna ||  ||  ||
|-
| 04F ||  || bgcolor=#|Tropical Disturbance || bgcolor=#|Not Specified || bgcolor=#| || Solomon Islands || None || None ||
|-
| Ivy ||  || bgcolor=#| || bgcolor=#| || bgcolor=#| || Vanuatu, Solomon Islands, New Caledonia, New Zealand ||$3.8 million ||4||
|-
| 06F || March 20 – 22 || bgcolor=#|Tropical Depression || bgcolor=#|Not Specified || bgcolor=#|Not Specified || None || None || None ||
|-
| Grace ||  || bgcolor=#| || bgcolor=#| || bgcolor=#| || None || None || None ||
|-
| 08F || March 28 – April 1 || bgcolor=#|Tropical Depression || bgcolor=#|Not Specified || bgcolor=#|Not Specified || None || None || None ||
|-
| 09F || April 1 – 3 || bgcolor=#|Tropical Depression || bgcolor=#|Not Specified || bgcolor=#|Not Specified || None || None || None ||
|-
| 10F ||  || bgcolor=#|Tropical Depression || bgcolor=#|55 km/h (35 mph) || bgcolor=#|995 hPa (29.38 inHg) || Fiji || $4.17 million||11||
|-
| 11F || April 6 – 7 || bgcolor=#|Tropical Depression || bgcolor=#|Not Specified || bgcolor=#|Not Specified || None || None || None ||
|-
| 12F || April 7 – 13 || bgcolor=#|Tropical Depression || bgcolor=#|Not Specified || bgcolor=#|Not Specified || Fiji || None || None ||
|-
| 13F || April 11 – 13 || bgcolor=#|Tropical Depression || bgcolor=#|Not Specified || bgcolor=#|Not Specified || None || None || None ||
|-
| 14F ||  || bgcolor=#| || bgcolor=#| || bgcolor=#| || Tonga ||  ||  ||
|-
| 15F ||  || bgcolor=#| || bgcolor=#| || bgcolor=#| || None ||  ||  ||
|-

See also 

 List of Southern Hemisphere tropical cyclone seasons
 Tropical cyclones in 2004
 Atlantic hurricane seasons: 2003, 2004
 North Indian Ocean cyclone seasons: 2003, 2004
 Pacific hurricane seasons: 2003, 2004
 Pacific typhoon seasons: 2003, 2004

Notes

References

External links 

 
South Pacific cyclone seasons
Articles which contain graphical timelines
2003 SPAC
2004 SPAC